End Mountain is a summit in Alberta, Canada.

End Mountain was so named on account of its end position on a range.

References

Two-thousanders of Alberta
Alberta's Rockies